The table below indicates the types and, where known, numbers of administrative divisions used by countries having territories in  South America and their major dependent territories. It is ordered alphabetically by country name in English.

France's territory in South America is French Guiana. The Netherlands' territories in South America are Aruba, Bonaire and Curaçao. The United Kingdom's territories in South America are the Falklands Islands, and South Georgia and the South Sandwich Islands.

Table

 apseudo-municipalities (administration is appointed)
 ccapital; see also Capitals serving as administrative divisions.
 ddistricts.
 iinformals.
 mmunicipalities.
 pprovinces.
 rregions.

Notes
 Numbers of divisions  To simplify maintaining the table, numbers of divisions are only specified where a country has around thirty or fewer instances; for example, as of 2010, the twelve qarqe (counties) of Albania. For numbers greater than thirty, the number rounded down to the nearest ten (or, in the case of thousands, the nearest hundred) is given, suffixed by a plus sign "+"; for example, the "300+" komuna (communes) of Albania. More precise figures should be found in the articles linked by the table.

 Terms in italics  Terms in italics are terms in languages other than English. They should be in plural form, followed by a footnote or footnotes indicating the generally accepted English equivalent or translation. Known alternative spellings are given in brackets following a term.

 Terms in brackets  Entries in standard brackets either indicate that the term used is informal or that its use is yet to be confirmed. An English term in square brackets indicates that the local name for the term is not yet known or confirmed; when confirmed, it is replaced by the local name in italics.

 Footnote letters ( c d m p r )  These indicate, respectively, five common types of administrative division in English: capitals; districts; municipalities; provinces; and regions. Other English terms appear among the numbered footnotes.

Administrative divisions with ISO 3166-1
Administrative divisions with ISO 3166-1 are cited for statistics matters even when they do not have a special status (for example, the overseas regions of France).

Antarctic claims
Administrative divisions that are entirely Antarctic claims suspended under the Antarctic Treaty are not listed.

Autonomous areas
Not all the autonomous areas are part of the formal hierarchy of the administrative division system of a country (for example, the autonomous region of Zanzibar comprises 5 regions of Tanzania, the first tier on administrative divisions on that country). For more details, see List of autonomous areas by country.

Dependent territories
Dependent territories are listed with their sovereign country. For more details,  see List of dependent territories.

See also
 Country subdivision
 ISO 3166-2, codes for country subdivisions
 Associated state
 Asymmetric federation
 Condominium, joint sovereignty over an area shared by two or more states.
 Dependent territory
 Federacy
 Federation
 Federated state
 List of terms for country subdivisions
 List of capitals serving as administrative divisions by country
 List of autonomous areas by country
 List of sovereign states
 List of the most populous country subdivisions
 Matrix of country subdivisions
 List of political and geographic subdivisions by total area, comparing continents, countries, and first-level administrative country subdivisions.
 List of political and geographic subdivisions by total area (all)
 List of FIPS region codes in FIPS 10-4, withdrawn from the Federal Information Processing Standard (FIPS) in 2008
 Nomenclature of Territorial Units for Statistics (NUTS), which covers the subdivisions of the members of the European Union

Territorial entities in South America

South America, Administrative divisions of